Çukurpınar Cave is a cave in Mersin Province, Turkey. 

The cave is in the rural area of Anamur ilçe (district) close to Sugözü  village. It is next to Egma Sinkhole.

The location is a yayla (temporary summer camp) of Kükür  village and the cave was discovered by a citizen of Kükür. The exploration was carried out between 24 July 1989 and 6 September 1992 in five phases by Bümak, the mountaineering team of Boğaziçi University. 

(The first is nearby Egma Sinkhole). There are two ponds in the cave and the water from the ponds is discharged to Dragon Creek.

References

Landforms of Mersin Province
Anamur District
Caves of Turkey